Cornelius "Cory" A. Matthews is a fictional character appearing on the 1993 family sitcom Boy Meets World and its 2014 sequel Girl Meets World, both created by Michael Jacobs and April Kelly.

He is portrayed by Ben Savage.

Biography 

During the first season, Cory Matthews attended Jefferson Elementary School in Philadelphia, Pennsylvania, with his friend Shawn Hunter and love-interest Topanga Lawrence, and was taught by Mr. George Feeny. 

In the second season, he begins attending John Adams High School, which he attends through this season to season five.  During high-school, the trio navigate adolescence and he explores his relationship with Topanga. Ultimately, the pair become engaged at graduation.

He attends his first two years of college at Penbrooke University.  He marries Topanga in their sophomore year and later, he moves to New York when his wife accepts an internship at a law firm.

After graduating from college, Matthews becomes a history teacher at John Quincy Adams High School located in New York where he is still married to Topanga, and together they have two kids - August "Auggie" and Riley.

Other appearances 
Aside from his leading roles on Boy Meets World and Girl Meets World, Savage reprised the role of Cory Matthews for a commercial for Panera Bread in 2021, alongside Danielle Fishel.

Reception 
Throughout the years, many fans have shown their love and fondness of both the character of Matthews and the relationship he has with Topanga Lawrence as well as his life-long best friend Shawn Hunter. However, some journalists feel as though Matthews is one of the weaker characters in the series, critiquing his infidelity and stubbornness, among other traits.

See also 

 List of Boy Meets World characters

References 

Boy Meets World
Fictional high school teachers
Television characters introduced in 1993
American male characters in television
Fictional hypochondriacs
Fictional characters from Philadelphia